Zuzana Moravčíková may refer to:

Zuzana Moravčíková (ice hockey) (born 1980), Slovak ice hockey forward
Zuzana Moravčíková (runner) (born 1956), former Czechoslovak track athlete

See also 
 Moravčík